KBYO may refer to:

 KBYO-FM, a radio station (92.7 FM) licensed to Farmerville, Louisiana, United States
 KBYO (AM), a defunct radio station (1360 AM) formerly licensed to Tallulah, Louisiana